The lemon-bellied flyrobin or lemon-bellied flycatcher (Microeca flavigaster) is a species of bird in the family Petroicidae. Found in Australia, Indonesia, and Papua New Guinea, its natural habitats are subtropical or tropical moist lowland forests and subtropical or tropical mangrove forests.

Taxonomy
John Gould described the species in 1843 from a specimen from Port Essington in the Northern Territory. The species name is from the Latin word flavus meaning 'yellow', and Ancient Greek gaster meaning 'belly'. Four subspecies are recognised: the nominate flavigaster is found across the top of the Northern Territory, subspecies flavissima in Cape York and New Guinea, subspecies laetissima along the central-northern Queensland coast, and subspecies tormenti in the Kimberley of northwestern Australia. The two Queensland subspecies are separated by the Atherton Tableland and Burdekin-Lynd Divide, and are possibly kept apart by a population of the jacky winter (Microeca fascinans) that replaces it in some areas. Genetic analysis shows that the two Queensland subspecies are very closely related, but that there is quite a large separation from subspecies flavigaster. Subspecies tormenti was not sampled in that study.
 
Subspecies tormenti, known as the Kimberley flyrobin, was considered a separate species for many years. It is unusual in that it lacks the yellow pigmentation of the other subspecies. Les Christidis and Walter Boles reclassified it as a subspecies, since hybrids between subspecies tormenti and flavigaster have been found in the vicinity of Cambridge Gulf—between the ranges of the two subspecies.

As well as lemon-bellied flyrobin, the species is also commonly known as lemon-breasted flycatcher (from when belly was thought crude), yellow-bellied flycatcher, yellow-breasted flycatcher, or brown-tailed flycatcher (subspecies tormenti).

Description
The sexes have similar plumage. The nominate subspecies flavigaster has lemon yellow underparts, a white throat, grey face with a white eyebrow stripe, and olive-brown upperparts. Subspecies tormenti has white underparts, more greyish upperparts, has a longer bill and tail and is larger overall. Subspecies flavissima resembles flavigaster but has a more obvious yellow tinge to the upperparts, throat, yellow eyebrow and a shorter tail, while laetissima more closely resembles flavigaster, but has a shorter tail and bill and is larger overall.

Distribution and habitat
The species ranges from the Ord River in the west to coastal Queensland, and is found in mangroves, paperbark swamp forests, and woodland.

Feeding
The lemon-bellied flyrobin is an insectivore, hunting its prey in the foliage or dead branches of trees and shrubs and only rarely on the ground.

Breeding
Breeding throughout its range, the lemon-bellied flyrobin breeds from August to February, raising one or two broods a season. The nest is a small dish-shaped structure made of bark and grasses in the fork of a tree.

References

lemon-bellied flyrobin
Birds of New Guinea
Birds of the Northern Territory
Birds of Queensland
lemon-bellied flyrobin
Taxonomy articles created by Polbot